Karuppu Subbiah was an Indian actor who had acted over 300 Tamil language films in comedy roles and minor roles. He also has another name 'Mottai' Subbiah. He is notable for his comedian roles along with actor Goundamani. And also he acted along with most of Sivaji Ganesan's films during the 1960s and 1970s in cameo and minor roles. And, He has acted in several films in comedy roles in the 1980s and 1990s. His debut film was Indira En Selvam in 1962. He is well known for his dialogue, Jambalakidi Pamba.

Filmography 
This is a partial filmography. You can expand it.

1960s

1970s

1980s

1990s

References

External links 
 

Indian male comedians
Male actors in Tamil cinema
Tamil comedians
Tamil male actors
Indian male film actors
1997 deaths